is a Japanese actor. He is best known for his leading role as Ryotaro Nogami in the Kamen Rider Den-O franchise, and as Himura Kenshin in the live-action Rurouni Kenshin film and its sequels.

Satoh was born on 21 March 1989 in Iwatsuki-ku, Saitama. Satoh briefly worked as a child actor for three or four years, appearing in commercials and magazine photo shoots. After he entered higher grades in elementary school, he decided not to continue as a child actor due to a "shy personality". He graduated from Koshigaya Kita High School, Saitama in 2007. In the same year, while shooting Kamen Rider Den-O, he was diagnosed with primary pneumothorax after complaining about pain in the left chest, and has since recovered.

Career

2006–2008: Early works
Satoh was scouted by an agent from Amuse, Inc. in Harajuku in Tokyo when he was in senior high school, and made his debut in 2006. His first drama was Princess Princess D (TV Asahi) where he played the role of Toru Kouno. In 2007, he guest-starred in Shinigami no Ballad (Kentaroh Ishihara) and gained popularity in the seventeenth installment of the Kamen Rider series as Ryotaro Nogami. Satoh attributes the popularity of Den-O to its comedic timing.

2009–2011: Breakthrough
Following the success and popularity of Kamen Rider Den-O and its two further cinematic releases, in the spring of 2008, Satoh starred in the award-winning TBS drama Rookies as Yuya Okada, one member of a high school baseball club consisting of a group of delinquents. Satoh considers his role in Rookies to be his breakout role even though he only played a minor supporting role, as Rookies  was shown on prime time television and able to reach a much larger audience than any of his previous works. Satoh also starred in the live-action in the summer of 2009.

Satoh reprised his role as Ryotaro (Den-O) in the third film of Kamen Rider Den-O in October 2008. He also starred in the drama Bloody Monday, based on the manga with the same name.

In the following two years, Satoh starred or guest-starred in TV shows such as Mei's Butler, Mr. Brain, True Horror Stories and MW Dai-0-sho, and in films such as Goemon and Beck. In 2010, he played Okada Izō in his first Taiga drama Ryōmaden, and landed his first leading role on prime time television with teen drama Q10.

On 28 June 2011, he was confirmed to star as Himura Kenshin in a live action film adaptation of the manga series Rurouni Kenshin.

2012–present: Rurouni Kenshin films and career expansion

Released in August 2012, the film grossed a total of 3.01 billion yen at the domestic box office. Satoh made his stage debut as Romeo in the Japanese adaptation of Shakespearean classic Romeo and Juliet in May 2012.

His subsequent project Tonbi was a drama series based on a novel by Shigematsu Kiyoshi. He then starred in Real, a science fiction mystery movie directed by Kiyoshi Kurosawa, as well as The Liar and His Lover(she fell in love with my lie/she likes lies too much), a live-adaptation film based on the manga Kanojo wa Uso o Aishisugiteru.

In 2014, Satoh played the role of a rookie detective in Fuji TV's Bitter Blood. He reprised the role of Himura Kenshin in two sequel films of Rurouni Kenshin live action franchise, Kyoto Inferno and The Legend Ends, both of which were released in 2014. Rurouni Kenshin manga author Nobuhiro Watsuki praised Satoh's performance and called him the ideal actor to portray Kenshin. He, alongside Rurouni Kenshin co-stars Emi Takei, Munetaka Aoki, and director Keishi Ōtomo, was appointed as "Cultural Friendship Ambassador" to the Philippines by the Makati City council on 7 August 2014.

Riding upon his movie success, he made his TV return with the acclaimed TBS series The Emperor's Cook in early 2015. He followed up with 3 Toho Corporation films in 2015 and 2016 including the manga live adaptation Bakuman and light novel adaptation If Cats Disappeared from the World, as well as Someone. His role in the 2017 film The 8-Year Engagement (The true story of the bride's miracle over 8 years) earned him a nomination for best actor at the 41st Japan Academy Prize. In 2018, he starred in two award-winning television series: NHK Asadora Hanbun, Aoi and TBS series Blues of Stepmother and Daughter. In the same year he reprised the role of Ryotaro Nogami in the last Kamen Rider movie of the Heisei period.

In 2018, it was announced that the Rurouni Kenshin series would be getting two further installments, a prequel and a sequel to the original trilogy, with Satoh reprising his lead role. Principal filming wrapped in June of 2019, with the movies being screened in 2020.

In 2021, Satoh, along with One OK Rock and Ryūnosuke Kamiki left Amuse, Inc. and established a new agency with co-actor, Ryunosuke Kamiki, called “Co-LaVo”. He is also an unofficial member of the Elite Four in the Pokémon Trading Card Game since 14 December 2021.

Personal life 
Takeru has a younger sister. His parents divorced when he was in middle school. He played baseball during primary and middle school years, and has a black belt in Shorinji Kempo.

Filmography

Film

Television

Television Documentaries and Other Programs

Promotion videos

Mayday, Do You Ever Shine (2014)

Theater
 2012: Romeo and Juliet. Dir: Jonathan Munby, Akasaka ACT Theater, Theatre Brava!; role: Romeo

Discography

Singles
"Pre-go: Zero" (2007)
"Double-Action" (2007)
"Perfect-Action: Double-Action Complete Collection" (2007)
"Real-Action" (2007)
"Double-Action Wing form" (2008)

DVD
"My Color" (2008)
"HT" (2010)
"HT2" (2011)

Photobooks
 Pre-go: Zero (2007)
 Intently First Photobook (2008)
 400 Days Photo Album/Diary (2008)
 Takeru Magazine/Takeru Magazine Plus (2008–)
 Deep Breathing/ Second Photobook (2009)
 So Far So Good! Takeru Satoh Profile 2007–2010 (2010)
 Nouvelles (2011)
 Rocka Nibunnoichi 1/2 Vol. 1, 2, and 3 (2013)
 Rurouni Kenshin (2014)
 Alternative (2014) 
 If Cats Disappeared From the World (Movie) Official Photo Book (2016) 
 "X (Ten)" Satoh Takeru Photo Book + DVD (2016) 
 RurouNihon Kumamoto (2017) 
 Satoh Takeru in Hanbun, Aoi Photobook (2018) 
 13years～TAKERU Satoh ANNIVERSARY BOOK 2006→2019～ (2019)

Awards and nominations

References

External links

 Company website

 Official profile 
 Official blog 

1989 births
Living people
People from Saitama (city)
Amuse Inc. talents
Japanese male television actors
Japanese male film actors
21st-century Japanese male actors